Milton Smith (March 27, 1929 – April 11, 1997) was an American professional baseball player who appeared in 36 Major League Baseball games for the 1955 Cincinnati Redlegs.

Smith was born in Columbus, Georgia. He broke into professional baseball in 1948 with the minor league Raleigh Tigers of the Negro American Association and then the New Orleans Creoles of the Negro Southern League. In 1949, Smith was with the Charlotte Blues of the NAA before moving on to the major league Philadelphia Stars of the Negro American League later that year. He played for the Stars until 1951, with only a brief stint with the Kansas City Monarchs at the start of 1950.

Smith entered "organized baseball" in 1952 when he was signed by the San Diego Padres of the Pacific Coast League. His contract was purchased by Cincinnati in November 1954, and he was optioned back to San Diego. The Redlegs recalled him in July 1955 after Smith batted .338 for the PCL Padres with 65 runs batted in in 108 games.

He stayed with Cincinnati for the remainder of the baseball season, starting 25 games at third base and three at second base.  He collected 20 hits, including three doubles, one triple and three home runs. He was sent back to the Pacific Coast League in 1956 and played the remainder of his career in the minors, retiring after the 1961 campaign.

Milt Smith died in San Diego at the age of 68 and was interred in that city's Greenwood Memorial Park.

See also
 List of Negro league baseball players who played in Major League Baseball

References

External links

1929 births
1997 deaths
African-American baseball players
Baseball players from Columbus, Georgia
Cincinnati Redlegs players
Hawaii Islanders players
Lewiston Broncs players
Major League Baseball third basemen
Omaha Cardinals players
Philadelphia Stars players
Sacramento Solons players
Salem Senators players
San Diego Padres (minor league) players
Seattle Rainiers players
Toronto Maple Leafs (International League) players
Tri-City Atoms players
American expatriate baseball players in Cuba
American expatriate baseball players in Canada
Marianao players
20th-century African-American sportspeople